Nagari, also Nagri, is a village situated 12 km north of Chittorgarh in Rajasthan state in India.  Its ancient name was Madhyamika.  It was a flourishing town from the Mauryan period up to Gupta period.  The excavations here have shown some ancient archaeological structure with few believed to be religious in nature. The excavated Nagari temple too has been dated to the second half of the 1st-millennium BCE. A large number of punch marked and other old coins have been discovered here.

In the 2nd century BC Nagari was probably attacked by the Indo-Greeks who were ruling North-Western of India.  As per Patanjali (150 BC) the great grammarian, Madhyamika was besieged by a Yavana king in 150 BC. Patanjali describes in the Mahābhāsya, the invasion in two examples using the imperfect tense of Sanskrit, denoting a recent event:
 "Arunad Yavanah Sāketam" ("The Yavanas (Greeks) were besieging Saketa")
 "Arunad Yavano Madhyamikām" ("The Yavanas were besieging Madhyamika" (the "Middle country").

In the 1st century BC Nagari was probably occupied by the Sibis.  Coins of Sibi tribe found here have the legend ‘majhamikaya sibi-janapadasa’.

Nagari came under the influence of Western Kshatrapas in the 2nd century.  In the 3rd century Nagari was ruled by Malavas.  Later Huna king conquered it.

One stupa has been discovered at Nagari.  It is constructed of moulded bricks and decorated with terracotta tiles of high artistic merit.

References

External links 
 

History of Rajasthan
Ancient Indian cities
Villages in Chittorgarh district
Tourist attractions in Chittorgarh district